Unconscious may refer to:

Physiology 
 Unconsciousness, the lack of consciousness or responsiveness to people and other environmental stimuli

Psychology 
 Unconscious mind, the mind operating well outside the attention of the conscious mind as defined by Sigmund Freud and others
 Unconscious, an altered state of consciousness with limited conscious awareness
 Not conscious

Philosophy, spirituality 
 Unconscious spirit, the supposed part of the human spirit or soul operating outside of conscious awareness

Media 
 Unconscious (2014), UK release title of Amnesiac, an American mystery film

See also 
 Inconscientes
 Consciousness
 Unconscious communication
 Subconscious
 Carl Jung's concept of collective unconscious
 Unconscious cognition
 Subliminal stimuli
 Priming (psychology)